Loreto Canton is a canton of Ecuador, located in the Orellana Province.  Its capital is the town of Loreto.  Its population at the 2001 census was 13,462.

Demographics
Ethnic groups as of the Ecuadorian census of 2010:
Indigenous  67.4%
Mestizo  27.3%
White  2.9%
Afro-Ecuadorian  1.5%
Montubio  0.6%
Other  0.2%

References

Cantons of Orellana Province